Asuri or Ashuri or Ashurit may refer to:
Assyrian
 Ashur (god), the national God of Assyria
 Ktav Ashuri or "Assyrian script", the Hebrew alphabet
Sanskrit asuri:
 Feminine of Asura, a group of power-seeking deities
 The feminine divinity Devi
 Maya or Dirghajihvi, a Rakshasi 
 A rishi mentioned in the Satapatha Brahmana
 Asuri Kesava Somayaji, the father of Ramanuja
 Asuri metre of the Zend Avesta
 Asur people of India
 Asuri language, an Austro-Asiatic language spoken by the Asur tribes

See also
 Ashur (disambiguation)
 Asura (disambiguation)